Kenneth Hugh Irvine (12 February 1923 – 3 May 2011) was a British wrestler. He competed at the 1948 Summer Olympics and the 1952 Summer Olympics.

References

External links
 

1923 births
2011 deaths
British male sport wrestlers
Olympic wrestlers of Great Britain
Wrestlers at the 1948 Summer Olympics
Wrestlers at the 1952 Summer Olympics
Sportspeople from London